Monica Yin (born 2 December 1977) is a Taiwanese actress.

Filmography

Television series

References

External links

 
 

1977 births
21st-century Taiwanese actresses
Living people